Kuhsaran may refer to:
 Kuhsaran District, in Kerman Province
 Kuhsaran Rural District, in Mazandaran Province